is a former rural district located in eastern Aichi Prefecture, Japan. 
As of 2008 (the last data available), the district had an estimated population of 21,766 and a population density of 2194 persons per km2. Its total area was 9.92 km2.

History
Hoi District was one of the ancient districts of Mikawa province, and is mentioned in Nara period records. Originally covering all of eastern Mikawa, Shitara District to the north was separated from Hoi in 903. The district contained the provincial capital of Mikawa along with the provincial temple, both of which were located in what is now part of the city of Toyokawa. During the Sengoku period, the area was controlled by various samurai clans, including the Makino and branches of the Honda and Matsudaira clans, all of whom rose to high positions within the Tokugawa shogunate. The area was also a battlefield between the forces of the Imagawa clan and the Oda and Tokugawa clans during the late Sengoku period. In the cadastral reforms of the early Meiji period, on July 22, 1878 modern Hoi District was created, with its headquarters at Goyu-shuku, a former station on the Tōkaidō. With the organization of municipalities on October 1, 1889, Hoi District was divided into 33 villages.

Gamagōri and Uchikubo villages were elevated to town status on October 6, 1891. They were followed in rapid succession by Shimoji (October 16, 1891), Goyu (January 29, 1892), Toyokawa (March 13, 1893), Akasaka and Kō (June 23, 1894), and Miya (December 10, 1894). In a round of consolidation, the remaining number of villages was reduced from 25 to 11 in 1906. The District office was transferred to the town of Kō in 1923. Katahara was raised to town status on April 1, 1924, Kosakai on September 12, 1926 and Mito on February 11, 1930. On September 1, 1932, Shimoji was annexed by the neighboring city of Toyohashi. The city of Toyokawa was formed on June 1, 1943 by the merger of the towns of Toyokawa, Ushikubo and Kō and the village of Yawata. Nishiura was raised to town status on February 11, 1944.

On April 1, 1954, the city was Gamagōri was formed by the merger of Gamagōri and Miya towns and Shiotsu village. In a further round of consolidations in 1955, Otowa Town was formed on April 1, 1955 and the structure of the district became six towns and one village. On April 1, 1959, Goyu was annexed by Toyokawa. The village of Ichinomiya was raised to town status on April 1, 1961. Katahara and Nishiura were annexed by Gamagōri on April 1, 1962 and April 1, 1963 respectively. In a final round of merges, Ichinomiya was annexed by Toyokawa on February 1, 2006, followed by Otowa and Mita on January 15, 2008. When Kozakai merged in Toyokawa on February 1, 2010, Hoi ceased to exist as an administrative division.

External links
Counties of Japan

Former districts of Aichi Prefecture